Furkan Alakmak (born 28 September 1991) is a Dutch-Turkish footballer who plays as a winger for SC Woezik in the Dutch Eerste Klasse.

Club career
He played in the Netherlands for NEC, RKC Waalwijk and FC Eindhoven, before moving to Turkey to play for second division side Göztepe. In 2015 his contract was cancelled by mutual consent and returned to the Netherlands and joined amateur side OJC Rosmalen in January 2016.

References

1991 births
Living people
Sportspeople from Oss
Dutch people of Turkish descent
Dutch footballers
Association football wingers
NEC Nijmegen players
RKC Waalwijk players
FC Eindhoven players
Göztepe S.K. footballers
Eredivisie players
Eerste Divisie players
Derde Divisie players
OJC Rosmalen players
JVC Cuijk players
Eerste Klasse players
SC Woezik players
Footballers from North Brabant